The Blaauwkrantz Nature Reserve is a small reserve near Makhanda (Grahamstown) for the purpose of conserving the endangered Eastern Province rocky. Nearby the reserve is the Waters Meeting Nature Reserve and Buffalo Kloof Protected Environment. The Blaauwkrantz Pass (R67) runs along the length of the reserve, while the Bloukrans River bisects it horizontally.

History 
In 1985, 198.31 ha of land was proclaimed for the conservation of the endangered Eastern Province rocky.

Biodiversity 
The reserve, consisting of veld vegetation, has over 200 plant species including aloe and tree euphorbia. The pool in the reserve, Blaauwkrantz Pool, is one of the last refuges of the endemic Eastern Province rocky (rocky kurper). Birds found on the reserve are fish eagles and kingfisher. Otters can also be found in the reserve.

Threats 
The Blaauwkrantz Pool, containing the rocky kurper, faces a number of threats from sewage treatment to agricultural practices like the leaching of fertilisers into the water upstream which lead to the excessive growth of red water fern that cover the water, preventing plankton (which require sunlight in order to survive) from growing which is a source of food for young rocky kurpers.

See also 

 List of protected areas of South Africa

References 

Nature reserves in South Africa
Eastern Cape Provincial Parks